Philip James Stanhope, 1st Baron Weardale (8 December 1847 – 1 March 1923), was a British Liberal Party politician and philanthropist.

Background and early life
Stanhope was born in Marylebone, London. A member of an important political family, he was the younger son of Philip Stanhope, 5th Earl Stanhope, and Emily Harriet Kerrison, daughter of General Sir Edward Kerrison, 1st Baronet. Arthur Stanhope, 6th Earl Stanhope, and Edward Stanhope were his elder brothers (in contrast to him they were both Conservative Party politicians). Having joined the Royal Navy as a young man, he rose to the rank of lieutenant before he left the service.

Political career
In 1886 Stanhope was elected to the House of Commons as the Member of Parliament (MP) for Wednesbury. Having lost his seat in 1892, he was elected again in 1893 for Burnley, a seat he held until 1900. Defeated again, he was elected in 1904 for Harborough, a seat he held until 1906, when he was elevated to the peerage as Baron Weardale, of Stanhope in the County of Durham.

A prominent opponent of war – including the Boer War – he was president of the sixth National Peace Conference in Leicester in 1910, led the British group in the Inter-Parliamentary Union, and became president of that organisation from 1912 to 1922. He was also president of the Save the Children Fund and a trustee of the National Portrait Gallery.

With Lord Curzon, he became in 1912 joint president of the National League for Opposing Woman Suffrage, an anti-suffrage organisation. In 1914 he was attacked with a dogwhip at Euston Station by a suffragette who mistook him for the Prime Minister, H. H. Asquith.

Personal life
Lord Weardale married Countess Alexandra Tolstoy (1856–1934), granddaughter of the German-born Russian Count Georg von Cancrin and widow of Count Tolstoy, a relative of the writer Leo Tolstoy, in 1877. They lived at The Wodehouse near Wombourne, where they entertained William Ewart Gladstone.

In 1906, he built Weardale Manor, a country house on Toys Hill, Brasted Chart, near Sevenoaks in Kent. A substantial house – 145 rooms – it was only occupied during the summer months. He died in Sevenoaks in March 1923, aged 75, and was buried at Chevening. As he had no children the barony became extinct on his death. After his death, Lady Weardale rarely visited Weardale Manor. On her death in 1934, she left it to her nephew, Lord Stanhope. Lacking the funds to maintain it, he allowed it to fall into disrepair and it was demolished in 1939, as were many country houses at that time.

Further reading
Private papers of Lord and Lady Weardale are held at the Centre for Kentish Studies of the Kent Archives Service.
There are some papers of Lord Weardale in the Save the Children archives.

References

External links
 

1847 births
1923 deaths
Younger sons of earls
Stanhope, Philip
Barons in the Peerage of the United Kingdom
Stanhope, Philip
Stanhope, Philip
Stanhope, Philip
Stanhope, Philip
Stanhope, Philip
Politics of Burnley
Philip
Anti-suffragists
Peers created by Edward VII
People from Sevenoaks
People from Marylebone